Petit-Bourg is the seventh-largest commune in the French overseas department of Guadeloupe. It is located on the east side of the island of Basse-Terre, and is part of the metropolitan area of Pointe-à-Pitre, the largest metropolitan area in Guadeloupe.

It has many tourist attractions: the Cascade aux Ecrevisse (waterfall), the National Park of Guadeloupe, the Saut de la Lézarde (waterfall), as well as the Kassaverie (cassava/manioc factory) located downtown.

Geography

Climate
Petit-Bourg has a tropical rainforest climate (Köppen climate classification Af).

Population

Education
Public preschools include:
 Ecole maternelle Carrère
 Ecole maternelle Albertine Mignard
 Ecole maternelle Pointe à Bacchus

Public primary include:
 Ecole primaire Maurice Chovino
 Ecole primaire Fribert Fessin
 Ecole primaire Robert Freti
 Ecole primaire Marie Bilioti de Gage
 Ecole primaire Hyacinththe Geriac
 Ecole primaire M-thérèse Lamothe
 Ecole primaire La Lézarde
 Ecole maternelle Mayeko Massina
 Ecole primaire Montébello

Public junior high schools include:
 Collège Félix Eboue

Public senior high schools include:
 LGT Droits de l'Homme

See also 
 Communes of the Guadeloupe department

References 

Communes of Guadeloupe